Charlie Pickett may refer to:

 Charlie Pickett (pitcher) (1883-1969), American baseball pitcher
 Charlie Pickett (musician) (born 1953), American rock musician